Control Pictures is a Unicode block containing characters for graphically representing the C0 control codes, and other control characters. Its block name in Unicode 1.0 was Pictures for Control Codes.

Block

History
The following Unicode-related documents record the purpose and process of defining specific characters in the Control Pictures block:

See also 
 ISO 2047

References 

Unicode blocks